Setesdalsbunad or women's folk costume from Valle in Setesdal as the original name, is a costume based on the costume traditions of Valle in Aust-Agder, Norway. In addition, this costume is one of the oldest costumes that have been used continuously for years, both in everyday life and for party use.  Today is the Setesdalsbunad remains as an outfit to mark an anniversary, among them the Norwegian Constitution Day on 17 May each year.  In addition, there is also a traditional Setesdalsbunad used by men.  The male version is characterized by the back part which partially is made of leather.

Gallery: Setesdalsbunad

See also 

 Bunad
 List of national costumes of Norway

References 

Setesdal
Bunad